The Cross-Border Interbank Payment System (CIPS) is a payment system which offers clearing and settlement services for its participants in cross-border RMB payments and trade. Backed by the People's Bank of China (PBOC), China launched the CIPS  in 2015 to internationalise RMB use. CIPS also counts several foreign banks as shareholders including HSBC, Standard Chartered, the Bank of East Asia, DBS Bank, Citi, Australia and New Zealand Banking Group and BNP Paribas.

In 2021, CIPS processed around 80 trillion yuan ($12.68 trillion), with about 1280 financial institutions in 103 countries and regions having connected to the system.

History 
In 2012, the PBOC launched the construction of CIPS (phase 1). On October 8, 2015, CIPS (phase 1) was put into operation, with 19 direct participants and 176 indirect participants from 50 countries and regions all over 6 continents. The launch of CIPS was another milestone in the construction of China's financial market infrastructure, which marked the important progress in the development of China's modern payment system that integrated domestic and overseas payments of RMB. CIPS played a significant role in facilitating RMB being officially included in the Special Drawing Rights (SDR).

March 2016, SWIFT and CIPS sign memorandum of understanding (MOU). ISO 200022 standard already adopted by CIPS for its payment system, SWIFT went through the implementation process of the standard that can allow the use of Chinese characters in addition to its richer content functionalities.

September 2017, As one of MOU plan signed between SWIFT and CIPS, reference data indicating financial institutions’ direct and indirect participation to CIPS will be published via SWIFTRef and updated on a monthly basis. This data covers BIC, LEI, national bank codes and IBAN data, standing settlement instructions, credit ratings, as well as financial institutions’ memberships to domestic and cross-border payment market infrastructures.

After the launch of CIPS (phase 1), its functions have been steadily improved, which led to the operation of CIPS (phase 2).

On March 26, 2018, CIPS (phase 2) was launched on a pilot basis, with 10 direct participants. On May 2, 2018, CIPS (phase 2) was in its full operation with other qualified direct participants. On October 9, CIPS (phase 2) put into operation the Delivery Versus Payment (DVP) settlement and supported Northbound Trading of Bond Connect, which would reduce settlement risks and improve efficiency of cross-border bond transactions.

By the end of 2019, CIPS had 33 direct participants and 903 indirect participants (from 94 countries and regions) with an increase of 74% and 413% as compared to that in 2015, respectively. Through these direct and indirect participants, the network of CIPS has reached 3000+ banking institutions over 167 countries and regions. By the end of 2019, 1017 banking institutions from 59 BRI countries and regions (including mainland China, Hong Kong SAR, Macao SAR and Taiwan) ran their business via CIPS.

In 2021, CIPS processed around 80 trillion yuan ($12.68 trillion), with about 1280 financial institutions in 103 countries and regions having connected to the system.

Standards 
CIPS uses the SWIFT industry standard for syntax in financial messages. Messages formatted to SWIFT standards can be read and processed by many well-known financial processing systems, whether or not the message traveled over the SWIFT network. SWIFT cooperates with international organizations for defining standards for message format and content. CIPS also subscribes to registration authority (RA) for the following ISO standards:
 ISO 9362: 1994 Banking—Banking telecommunication messages—Bank identifier codes
 ISO 10383: 2003 Securities and related financial instruments—Codes for exchanges and market identification (MIC)
 ISO 13616: 2003 IBAN Registry
 ISO 15022: 1999 Securities—Scheme for messages (Data Field Dictionary) (replaces ISO 7775)
 ISO 20022-1: 2004 and ISO 20022-2:2007 Financial services—UNIversal Financial Industry message scheme
In RFC 3615 urn:swift: was defined as Uniform Resource Names (URNs) for SWIFT FIN.

Products and participants 
The main functions of the CIPS are to facilitate processing of cross-border RMB business and to support settlement of cross-border trade in goods and services, cross-border direct investment, cross-border financing and cross-border individual remittance.

Participants 
CIPS participants are divided into two types: direct participant and indirect participant. Direct participants open an account in the CIPS, directly send and receive messages through the CIPS, while indirect participants have indirect access to services provided by the CIPS through direct participants.

As of June 2022, CIPS has 1341 participants with 76 as Direct Participants and 1265 as Indirect Participants.

Among indirect participants, 965 participants are from Asia (including 547 from Chinese Mainland), 185 from Europe, 46 from Africa, 29 from North America, 23 from Oceania, and 17 from South America, covering 106 countries and regions around the world.

Standard Transceiver 
Based on the message scheme of ISO20022 and compatible with the current CIPS standards, CIPS Standard Transceiver is the information exchange component between CIPS Direct/Indirect Participants and their institutional clients, and the application carrier of CIPS Standard.

Geo-economic impacts 
As academic Tim Beal summarizes, CIPS is among the responses to sanctions imposed by the United States which commentators view as contributing to dedollarization.

See also 

 ABA routing transit number
 Bilateral key exchange and the new Relationship Management Application (RMA)
 Electronic money
 ISO 9362, the SWIFT/BIC code standard
 ISO 15022
 ISO 20022
 List of financial regulatory authorities by country
 Organisation for Economic Co-operation and Development (OECD)
 Routing number (Canada)
 Single Euro Payments Area (SEPA)
 Society for Worldwide Interbank Financial Telecommunication (SWIFT)
 SPFS (Russia)
 Structured Financial Messaging System (India)
 Value transfer system

References 

Market data
Society for Worldwide Interbank Financial Telecommunication
Financial markets software
Payment networks
Financial regulation in China